Michael John Darby (born 29 July 1959) is an Australian who has run for political office for the Liberal Party and the Christian Democratic Party. He is an active business man, having had business ventures in Africa, Asia and Latin America, and is fluent in Mandarin Chinese.

Darby is the son of long-serving state Liberal MP Douglas Darby and attended Newington College (1957–1962). A former army officer and interpreter, he became active in politics in the 1970s. His first run for office was as the Liberal candidate for the safe Labor seat of Werriwa in the 1974 federal election, running against then-Prime Minister Gough Whitlam.

In 1975, Darby was one of the organisers of the Australian Society for Intercountry Aid – Timor, based in Dili. He was present at the hijacking of a Royal Australian Air Force (RAAF) plane in Baucau by  Timorese Democratic Union (UDT) soldiers, who had surrendered to him and asked to be evacuated to Australia.

Darby later contested the 1988 Oxley by-election as an independent, and also ran as an independent in Dickson in 1993. He subsequently returned to the Liberal Party and ran in the fifth position on the Coalition Senate ticket for New South Wales in 2004. In 2009–2010 he was campaign director for the Christian Democratic Party.

References

External links
 Official Website
 Do CDP members realise what is happening?, at gordonmoyes.com
 Janine Cohen's interview with Michael Darby, Liberal Party Federal Council on Australian Broadcasting Corporation's Four Corners, 17 July 2006
 Angie Raphael, "Lone Anzac Day marcher during Perth lockdown revealed to be former One Nation staffer", news.com.au, 26 April 2021.

1945 births
Living people
Australian Army officers
People educated at Newington College
Liberal Party of Australia politicians
Christian Democratic Party (Australia) politicians